This article details the Hull F.C. rugby league football club's 2014 season. This is the 19th season of the Super League era.

Pre season friendlies

Hull FC score is first.

Regular season results

References

External links
2014 Hull FC first team fixtures
Hull FC on Sky Sports
Hull FC on Super League Site
BBC Sport-Rugby League

Hull F.C. seasons
Hull FC season